Phu Loi Base Camp (also known as Darkhorse Base or Phu Loi Field) is a former U.S. Army base north of Saigon in southern Vietnam.

History

1940s-1963
Phu Loi airfield was originally established by the Japanese in the 1940s and was located approximately 20 km north of Saigon in Bình Dương Province. During the First Indochina War the base was used by the French as a prisoner of war camp for captured Viet Minh. Following the end of the war it was used to imprison opponents of the Ngo Dinh Diem government.

1965-72
The U.S. Army base was established in 1965.

The 2nd Brigade, 1st Infantry Division comprising:
2nd Battalion, 16th Infantry Regiment
1st Battalion, 18th Infantry Regiment
2nd Battalion, 18th Infantry Regiment
was based at Phu Loi from December 1965-February 1966.

The 3rd Brigade, 82nd Airborne Division comprising:
1st Battalion, 505th Infantry Regiment
2nd Battalion, 505th Infantry Regiment
was based at Phu Loi from September 1968-December 1969

Other units stationed at Phu Loi included:
11th Combat Aviation Battalion:
 128th Assault Helicopter Company
 173rd Assault Helicopter Company before moving to Lai Khe
 205th Aviation Support Helicopter Company
 213th Aviation Support Helicopter Company
 D Troop, 1st Squadron, 4th Cavalry Regiment
AVEL Central Avionics (January 1966-April 1972)
2nd Battalion, 34th Armor
34th Engineer Battalion (May 1968-October 1971)
1st Battalion, 27th Artillery (April–November 1967)
6th Battalion, 27th Artillery (March 1970-April 1971)
2nd Battalion, 32nd Artillery (October 1969-January 1972)
A Battery, 5th Battalion, 42d Field Artillery (January–March 1972)
44th Signal Battalion (May–June 1972)
82nd Brigade Support Battalion
3rd Battalion, 197th Artillery (September 1968-September 1969)

Current use
The base is largely abandoned, but a small section serves a museum. The former airfield is still clearly visible on satellite images.

References

Installations of the United States Army in South Vietnam
Buildings and structures in Bình Dương province